Christiane Gilles (1 April 1930 Vincennes, France - 29 October 2016 Chécy, France)
 was a French trade unionist. She was a member of the Confederal Bureau of the General Confederation of Labour from 1969 until 1981.

References

1930 births
2016 deaths
French trade unionists
French socialist feminists
French women trade unionists